The 2019–20 San Diego State Aztecs men's basketball team represented San Diego State University during the 2019–20 NCAA Division I men's basketball season. The Aztecs, led by third-year head coach Brian Dutcher, played their home games at Viejas Arena as members in the Mountain West Conference. They finished the season 30–2, 17–1 in Mountain West play to be regular season Mountain West champions. They defeated Air Force and Boise State to reach the championship game of the Mountain West tournament where they lost to Utah State. Although they were a virtual lock to receive an at-large bid to and a high seed in the NCAA tournament, on March 12 the NCAA Tournament was cancelled amid the COVID-19 pandemic.

Previous season
The Aztecs finished the season 21–13, 11–7 in Mountain West play to finish in a tie for fourth place. They defeated UNLV and Nevada to advance to the championship game of the Mountain West tournament where they lost to Utah State. They did not get selected for the NCAA or NIT tournaments, and despite having 21 wins, they did not seek participation in other post season tournaments such as the CBI or CIT.

Offseason

Departures

Incoming transfers

2019 recruiting class

2020 recruiting class

Roster

Schedule and results

|-
!colspan=9 style=| Exhibition

|-
!colspan=9 style=| Regular season

|-
!colspan=9 style=| Mountain West tournament

Source

Ranking movement

*AP does not release post-NCAA Tournament rankings.

References

San Diego State Aztecs men's basketball seasons
San Diego State
San Diego State
San Diego State